Ducretet et cie., later Ducretet Thomson was a French company founded by scientist Eugène Adrien Ducretet which produced, among other scientific instruments, an early "plate phonograph", or tinfoil disc player (1879) and a tinfoil phonograph for cylinders. The company was later absorbed into the French Thomson Group and the division's product line extended to early televisions.

The company brand was also used for a record label until the end of the 1950s. The label was eventually became part of London Records.

References

Electronics companies of France
French record labels